Egypt church bombing may refer to:

2011 Alexandria bombing
2016 Botroseya Church bombing
2017 Palm Sunday church bombings